Tibor Navracsics (born Veszprém, Hungary, 13 June 1966) is a Hungarian lawyer and politician, who served as Minister of Foreign Affairs and Trade from June to September 2014. He previously served as Minister of Administration and Justice between 2010 and 2014. He is a member of the Fidesz and was the European Commissioner for Education, Culture, Youth and Sport in the Juncker Commission.

Education 
Navracsics holds a degree in law (Eötvös Loránd University 1990) and a higher degree as judge (1992). He also received a PhD in political science at the Faculty of Law of the Eötvös Loránd University in 1999.

Career 
 1990–1992: Municipal Court, City of Veszprém – Tribunal Clerk;
 1992–1993: Regional Assembly of Veszprém County – Research Fellow;
 1993–1997: University of Economics, Budapest, Department of Political Sciences – Assistant Lecturer;
 1997– 1999: Department of Political Sciences – Senior Lecturer
 1999– 2001: Department of Political Sciences – Associate Professor
 1998–1999: Prime Minister's Office, Communications Department – Head of Department, (Viktor Orbán's Cabinet);
 1999–2002: Prime Minister's Office, Department for Press and Information – Head of Department;
 2002–2003: Parliamentary Group of Fidesz – Hungarian Civic Union, Head of Department for Political Analyses;
 2003–2006: Fidesz – Hungarian Civic Union, Chief of President's Cabinet;
 2004– Leader of the program-creating team, referred to as "Civic Governance";
 2006– Member of Parliament
 2001– : Department of Political Sciences Eötvös Loránd University – Senior Associate Professor
 2006–2010: Fidesz – Hungarian Civic Union – Leader of the Fraction
 The Congress of Fidesz in May, 2007, has accepted his (Navracsics's) polemical essay "Our Future";
 Member of the Political Sciences Association
 2010 – 2014: Minister of Public Administration and Justice
 2014: Minister of Foreign Affairs and Trade
 2014-2019 : European Commissioner for Education, Culture, Youth and Sport
 2022 : Minister without portfolio for Land Development

Professional experiences 

 1990–1992: Department of Social Sciences at the University of Veszprém – Lecturer;
 1992–1998: Dániel Berzsenyi Teacher's College, Szombathely – Department of Sociology and Political Sciences – Lecturer;
 1992–1993: Periodical Comitatus – Editor;
 1997–2000: Secretary General of the Hungarian Association of Political Scientists;
 1996– :  Vice-President, Association of the Hungarian Institute for Political Science;
 1999– : Member of the Editorial Board, Politikatudományi Szemle (Political Science Review);
 2001– :  Member of the Presidency, Hungarian Association of Political Science

Publications 
Európai belpolitika (Internal Politics in the European Union). Budapest: Korona, 1998
Political Analysis of the European Union, Bp., Korona, 1998Political Communication, 2004 (co-author: István Hegedűs-Szilágyi-Mihály Gál-Balázs Sipos)

Field of research 
Navracsics's field of research are comparative politics and internal politics in the European Union. Because he speaks Serbo-Croatian, he wrote a number of analyses regarding the former Yugoslavia.

Notable facts 
 At the invitation of the presidency he wrote about the ground values of the party a manifesto, after he organized several public debates on the topics of living standards, competitiveness, public services and justice. The manifesto was accepted by the 2007 Congress of the Fidesz – Hungarian Civic Union.
 He was elected  "Teacher of the Year 2007" by the students of ELTE.
 On 6 October 2014, the European Parliament proposed to reject him as EU commissioner-designate since he was found unsuitable for the post related to citizenship. Instead he was given the portfolio for Education, Culture, Youth and Sport.

References

External links 
 Fidesz – Hungarian Civic Union
 The Hungarian Parliament
 the manifesto

|-

|-

|-

|-

|-

|-

1966 births
Living people
Fidesz politicians
Foreign ministers of Hungary
Government ministers of Hungary
Hungarian European Commissioners
Justice ministers of Hungary
Members of the National Assembly of Hungary (2006–2010)
Members of the National Assembly of Hungary (2010–2014)
Members of the National Assembly of Hungary (2014–2018)
Members of the National Assembly of Hungary (2022–2026)
European Commissioners 2014–2019
People from Veszprém
Members of the fifth Orbán government